Henry Howard Whitney (December 25, 1866  – April 2, 1949) was a United States military officer who attained the rank of brigadier general. He was known primarily for the spy missions he carried out in Puerto Rico and Cuba prior to the start of the Spanish–American War.

Early life
Whitney was born in Glen Hope, Pennsylvania on December 25, 1866. The son of a clergyman and Union Army veteran of the American Civil War, he graduated from Dickinson Seminary and passed a competitive examination for appointment to the United States Military Academy in 1888. He graduated number 11 of 62 in the class of 1892, and was the class president for all four of his years at West Point. His fellow classmates included numerous men who would later attain general officer rank, such as Charles Pelot Summerall, Tracy Campbell Dickson, Frank W. Coe, William Ruthven Smith, James Ancil Shipton, Louis Chapin Covell, Preston Brown, George Blakely, Robert Mearns, Peter Weimer Davison, Howard Russell Hickok, Julian Robert Lindsey, John E. Woodward, John McAuley Palmer and George Columbus Barnhardt.

Start of career
Whitney was commissioned in the 4th Field Artillery. He was on special duty at the War Department from 1896 to 1898. In 1898, he was appointed Military Attaché to the American legation in Buenos Aires, and soon afterwards agreed to undertake a covert mission for the Secretary of War in anticipation of the Spanish–American War.

Spanish–American War
Whitney disguised himself as an English sailor, evaded capture by Spanish authorities, and made a military reconnaissance of Puerto Rico and Cuba, thereby gaining intelligence upon which General Nelson A. Miles based the war's Puerto Rican Campaign, and General William Rufus Shafter based his campaign in Cuba. In 1918, Whitney was awarded the Distinguished Service Cross for heroism in carrying out this spy mission. The citation for the medal reads:

Whitney served throughout the war as an assistant adjutant on the Miles's staff; after the war he was appointed as an aide-de-camp to Miles, and accompanied him on his around the world tour from 1902 to 1903.

After the war, Whitney served in the Philippines; commanded the Presidio of San Francisco and Fort Point, San Francisco during the Panama–Pacific International Exposition; and served on the Mexican border during the Pancho Villa Expedition.

World War I
During World War I, Whitney commanded the 63rd Field Artillery Brigade and was promoted to temporary brigadier general. He was later appointed a member of the staff of the American Expeditionary Forces headquarters, and was Chief of Staff for the Military District of Paris. Whitney retired as a colonel in 1920, and in 1930 he was promoted to brigadier general on the retired list as the result of a federal law which allowed World War I general officers to retire at the highest rank they had held.

Retirement and death
After the war, Whitney lived in California, where he was the president of a real estate finance company. He subsequently moved to New York City. Whitney died Madison, New Jersey on April 2, 1949. He was buried at Arlington National Cemetery, Section 3, Site 1920 EH.

Awards
In addition to the Distinguished Service Cross, Whitney received the Army Distinguished Service Medal, French Legion of Honor (Officer), Romanian Order of the Crown (Commander), and Montenegro's Order of Prince Danilo I (Commander).

Family
In 1897, Whitney married Ellen Wadsworth Closson, the daughter of Brigadier General Henry W. Closson; they were the parents of two children, Julie and Henry Wadsworth Whitney (1907–1958). Henry W. Whitney was a career Army officer who retired as a colonel; he is buried along with his father and mother at Arlington National Cemetery.

References

Sources

External links
 
 

1866 births
1949 deaths
American military personnel of the Spanish–American War
United States Army generals
People from Clearfield County, Pennsylvania
United States Military Academy alumni
Recipients of the Distinguished Service Cross (United States)
Recipients of the Distinguished Service Medal (US Army)
Commanders of the Order of the Crown (Romania)
Burials at Arlington National Cemetery
United States Army generals of World War I
Military personnel from Pennsylvania